Joseph de Maimieux (1753–1820), was a French noble who had emigrated to Germany at the time of the Revolution, who returned to France in 1797. He invented a sorte de système de langage universel ("kind of universal language system") which he exposed in Pasigraphie ou Premiers éléments du nouvel art-science, d’écrire et d’imprimer en une langue, de manière à être lu et entendu dans toute autre langue sans traduction… (Paris, 1797), completed by Pasigraphie et pasilalie, (Paris, an VIII) and Carte générale pasigraphique (1808).

According to Hoefer in his Nouvelle Biographie Générale, he may have helped general Firmas-Périés to write his Pasitélégraphie. Joseph de Maimieux was a member of the Société des observateurs de l'homme.

Selected works 
1788: Éloge philosophique de l'impertinence
1797:  Pasigraphie ou Premiers éléments du nouvel art-science, d’écrire et d’imprimer en une langue, de manière à être lu et entendu dans toute autre langue sans traduction…
1799: Pasigraphie et pasilalie, (Paris, an VIII)
1802: Épître familière au sens commun sur la pasigraphie et la pasilalie
1803: Propylée
1808: Carte générale pasigraphique.
1811: Céleste Paléologue, roman historique, traduit du grec

Sources 
 Ferdinand Hoefer. Nouvelle biographie générale, Paris, Didot, vol. 32, col. 893-894.

External links 

1753 births
1820 deaths
Creators of writing systems